Saint John School is a private, Catholic preschool to grade 12 school in Ashtabula, Ohio. Their mascot is the Fighting Heralds, and contests as a member of the Ohio High School Athletic Association and is a member of the Northeastern Athletic Conference.

Saint John School previously was the local Catholic high school in Ashtabula County, but as part of restructuring and growth in mission, now includes all elementary and high school grades.  It is a part of the Roman Catholic Diocese of Youngstown. The school was initially known as Saint John High School, changed its name to Saint John Catholic School, and has since changed to Saint John School.

Accreditation and curriculum
The school is a K-12 Youngstown Diocesan school accredited by the State of Ohio, through the Ohio Catholic Schools Accreditation Association. All teachers hold a current state license. While Roman Catholic in belief, all faiths and denominations are welcome. According to the school website, on the Ohio Graduation Test (OGT), taken by all schools in Ohio, the Saints John and Paul Class of 2011 ranked among the top 10% in the state of Ohio. St. John's consistently has the highest OGT scores in Ashtabula County.  Saint John School is a member of the National Catholic Education Association (NCEA) and the Sisters of Notre Dame Educational Association.

The curriculum includes advanced academic opportunities available through Ohio’s Post-Secondary Options Program at Kent State University, Ashtabula and Lakeland Community College. Advanced Placement (AP) high school classes are offered in English, Social Studies and Spanish.

In addition to its K-12 programs, Saint John also offers a Pre-Kindergarten program for 4-5 year old children.  This 4-day program emphasizes support for student growth in a small group setting, and provides opportunities for parents and grandparents to volunteer monthly with class.

Saint John has undergone a building and expansion program and has added a gymnasium, dining hall, and football field to its premises. In addition, school enrollment has increased from 324 students in 2011 to 413 students in 2016.

Extracurricular Activities 
St. John High School currently offers:

 Baseball
 Basketball
 Cross Country
 Cheerleading
 Football
 Golf
 Soccer
 Softball
 Track and Field
 Tennis
 Volleyball

Intramural Flag Football and Intramural Basketball are offered at the elementary level. A learning disability and a speech therapist are on staff to serve students in grades K-12.  Title One services also include a remedial and gifted tutor.

Ohio High School Athletic Association state championships
 Boys' Baseball - 1983

Tests of student proficiency and achievement

Saint John has a tradition of scholastic achievement.  Recent test scores are listed below.

2011 Proficiency Scores

Graduating Class of 2011 Test Performance

Saint John Class of 2013 achieved a high performance on the 8th grade Ohio Off-Grade Proficiency Tests

State of Ohio Graduation Test (OGT) Scores
(As of March, 2015 testing)
Class of 2016

Notable alumni
 Urban Meyer - former head coach of the Jacksonville Jaguars 
 O. James Lighthizer - former legislator and Secretary of the Maryland Department of Transportation 
 Larry Obhof - attorney and former Ohio Senate President
 John Spano - convicted felon and former owner of the New York Islanders

References

External links
 -- Saint John School Website  -- see sjheralds dot org
 -- Support Catholic Education
   - Annual St. Patrick's Day Reverse Raffle

Ashtabula, Ohio
Catholic secondary schools in Ohio
High schools in Ashtabula County, Ohio
Roman Catholic Diocese of Youngstown